Farsian (also Romanized as Fārsīān, Fārseyān, Fārsīyān, Parsian, and Parsiyān) is a village in Eqbal-e Gharbi Rural District, in the Central District of Qazvin County, Qazvin Province, Iran. At the 2006 census, its population was 2,628, in 630 families.

References 

Populated places in Qazvin County